Sergi Guilló Barceló (born 23 May 1991) is a Spanish footballer who last played for U.S.D. Recanatese 1923 as a central midfielder.

Football career
Guilló was born in Elche, Alicante, Valencian Community. A product of hometown Elche CF's youth system, he made his senior debuts with the reserves in 2010–11 season.

On 8 June 2013 Guilló made his professional debut, playing the last 28 minutes of a 3–1 home win over CD Guadalajara, for Segunda División championship. On 14 July 2014 he renewed his link for a further year.

On 8 July 2015 Guilló moved to Real Murcia in Segunda División B. On 30 August of the following year, he joined fellow league team Linares Deportivo.

References

External links

1991 births
Living people
Footballers from Elche
Spanish footballers
Association football midfielders
Segunda División players
Segunda División B players
Tercera División players
Elche CF Ilicitano footballers
Elche CF players
Real Murcia players